Hijjas Kasturi Associates Sdn. (also known as HIJJAS Architects & Planners) is a Malaysian architecture and planning firm based in Kuala Lumpur.

History 
Founded in 1977 by Malaysian architect, Hijjas Kasturi, the company designs buildings in Malaysia.

Notable buildings
 Tabung Haji (1986)
 Menara Maybank (1989)
 Alor Setar Tower (1997)
 Telekom Tower (2002)
 Putrajaya International Convention Centre (2003)

References

External links
 Official website

1977 establishments in Malaysia
Construction and civil engineering companies of Malaysia
Companies based in Kuala Lumpur
Malaysian companies established in 1977
Construction and civil engineering companies established in 1977